Sirpa Lane, born Sirpa Salo (1952–1999), was a Finnish actress known for her work in B-movies of the 1970s, primarily erotic and exploitation films. Lane was discovered by British photographer and film-maker David Hamilton, who was known for his soft focus and grainy style erotica. She worked with Roger Vadim, who spoke of her as the "next Bardot". She died of HIV/AIDS.

Biography
Lane was born in Turku, Finland in 1952. She made her debut in the English film Fluff (1974), directed by Robert Paget. She had a relationship with Gilles Raysse, a business manager. She died of HIV/AIDS at the age of 46 in Formentera, Spain in 1999.

Filmography
La jeune fille assassinée (The Assassinated Young Girl) (1974) aka Charlotte) as Charlotte Marley
Fluff (1974)
La Bête (The Beast) (1975) as Romilda de l'Esperance
Nazi Love Camp 27 (aka La svastica nel ventre/ The Swastika on the Belly) (1977) as Hannah Meyer
Malabestia (Evil Beast) (1978) as Ursula Drupp
Papaya, Love Goddess of the Cannibals (1978) as Sara
La bestia nello spazio (aka Beast in Space) (1980) as Lt. Sondra Richardson
Trois filles dans le vent (Three Women in the Wind) (1981) as Sirpa Lane
The Secret Nights of Lucrezia Borgia (aka Le notti segrete di Lucrezia Borgia) (1982) as Lucrezia Borgia
Exciting Love Girls (aka Giochi carnali / Carnal Game) (1983) as Dr. Daniara / Daniela Mauri (final film role)

References

External links 
 

1952 births
1999 deaths
Actors from Turku
Finnish film actresses
Finnish expatriates in Spain
People from Ibiza
AIDS-related deaths in Spain
20th-century Finnish actresses